This is a list of feminist artists. The list includes artists who have played a role in the feminist art movement which largely stemmed from second-wave feminism.

A

Pacita Abad (1946-2004)
Lida Abdul (born 1973)
Marina Abramović (born 1946)
Eija-Liisa Ahtila (born 1959)
Peggy Ahwesh (born 1954)
Jerri Allyn (born 1954)
Ghada Amer (born 1963)
Grimanesa Amorós (born 1962)
Alice Anderson (born 1972)
Nancy Angelo (born 1953)
Eleanor Antin (born 1935)
Janine Antoni (born 1964)
Ida Applebroog (born 1929)
Mireille Astore (born 1961)
Dotty Attie (born 1938)
Helene Aylon (1931-2020)
Nancy Azara (born 1939)

B

Alison Bechdel (born 1960)
Susan Bee (born 1952)
María Luisa Bemberg (born 1995)
Lynda Benglis (born 1941)
Siona Benjamin (born 1960)
Zarina Bhimji (born 1963)
Anna Biller (born 1965)
Phyllis Birkby (1932-1994)
Dara Birnbaum (born 1946)
Rocío Boliver
Lizzie Borden (born 1958)
Andrea Bowers (born 1965)
Sonia Boyce (born 1962)
Shary Boyle (born 1972)
Phyllis Bramson (born 1941)
Catherine Breillat (born 1948)
Barbara Leoff Burge
Marsha Burns (born 1945)
Maris Bustamante (born 1949)
Sheila Levrant de Bretteville (born 1940)
Tiffany Lee Brown (born 1973)

C

Claude Cahun (1894-1954)
Susana Campos (born 1942)
María Magdalena Campos Pons (born 1959)
Tammy Rae Carland (born 1965)
Elizabeth Catlett (1915-2012)
Helen Chadwick (1953-1996)
Sarah Charlesworth (1947-2013)
Shu Lea Cheang (born 1954)
Judy Chicago (born 1939)
Filiz Cicek
Minna Citron (1896-1991)
Tee Corinne (1943-2006)
Michèle Cournoyer (born 1943)
Renée Cox (born 1960)
Enid Crow (born 1968)

D

Max Dashu
Nancy Davidson
Vanessa Davis
Diane DiMassa
Kim Dingle
Alejandra Dorado
Orshi Drozdik
Rachel Blau DuPlessis

E

Mary Beth Edelson
Laurie Toby Edison
Kari Edwards
Tracey Emin
Paz Errázuriz 
Bracha L. Ettinger
Valie Export

F

Deej Fabyc
Joyce Farmer
Carole Feuerman
Karen Finley
Louise Fishman
Audrey Flack
Andrea Fraser
Helen C. Frederick

G

Regina José Galindo
Chitra Ganesh
Cheri Gaulke
Yishay Garbasz
Eunice Golden
Sarah Beth Goncarova
Jill Greenberg
Lauren Greenfield
Wynne Greenwood
Roberta Gregory
Grimes
Lourdes Grobet
Guerrilla Girls

H

Jasmin Hagendorfer
Barbara Hammer
Harmony Hammond
Hannah Holliday Stewart
Kathleen Hanna
Karin Hannak
Margaret Harrison
Mary Harron
Carla Harryman
Faye HeavyShield
Mercedes Helnwein
Eva Hesse
Hannah Höch
Jenny Holzer
Rebecca Horn
 Marge Helenchild
Irma Hünerfauth

I
Graciela Iturbide
Neema Iyer

J
Miranda July

K

Frida Kahlo
Ann Kalmbach
Vena Kava
Mary Kelly
Tatana Kellner
Swati Khurana
Vera Klement
Anastasia Klose
Kiki Kogelnik
Joyce Kozloff
Louise Kramer
Barbara Kruger
Yayoi Kusama

L

Natalia LL
Suzanne Lacy
Magali Lara
LasTesis
Phoebe Legere
Peta Lily
Jia-Jen Lin
Jacqueline Livingston
Llanakila
Irene Loughlin
Mina Loy

M

Mail Order Brides
Sarah Maple
Liliana Maresca
María Evelia Marmolejo 
Petra Mattheis
Monica Mayer
Juanita McNeely
Mary Meigs
Ana Mendieta
Susan Michod
Kate Millett
Hayao Miyazaki
Tracey Moberly
Chantal Montellier
Ree Morton
Ruth Mountaingrove
Prema Murthy

N

Alice Neel
Carol Heifetz Neiman
Shirin Neshat
Louise Nevelson
Hương Ngô
Polly Nor
Patsy Norvell

O
Hildegard Ochse
Yoko Ono
Catherine Opie
Tanja Ostojić

P
Marion Peck
Irene Peslikis
Polvo de Gallina Negra
Julieta Paredes

R

Arlene Raven
Faith Ringgold
Trina Robbins
Rachel Rosenthal
Martha Rosler
Alexandra Rubinstein

S

Jenny Saville
Miriam Schapiro
Mary Schepisi
Carolee Schneemann
Anne Seagrave
Joan Semmel
Fern Shaffer
Rhonda Roland Shearer
Cindy Sherman
Monica Sjöö
Sylvia Sleigh
Jeanette Pasin Sloan
Barbara T. Smith
Jean Smith
Kiki Smith
Annegret Soltau
Nancy Spero
Annie Sprinkle
M. Louise Stanley
Jonny Star
Anita Steckel
Linda Stein
Pat Steir 
Beth Stephens
Meredith Stern
May Stevens
Lynne Stopkewich
SubRosa

T

TART Artist Collective
Rini Templeton
Robin Tewes
Tlacuilas y Retrateras
Cosey Fanni Tutti
Betty Tompkins

U
Mierle Laderman Ukeles

W

The Waitresses
June Wayne
Anita Wetzel
Margaret Wharton
Susan Dorothea White
Faith Wilding
Hannah Wilke
Martha Wilson
Nancy Wilson-Pajic
Lorena Wolffer (México, 1971)
Kristina Wong
Saya Woolfalk

X
Márcia X

Y
Phyllis Yes
Nancy Youdelman

Z
Constantina Zavistanos

See also
Feminist art movement in the United States
List of contemporary artists

References

Lists of artists
Artists by genre
Artists